Vivian Shun-wen Wu (5 December 1913 – 9 August 2008), born in Changzhou, Jiangsu, China, was a prominent Taiwanese businesswoman. She was the former chairwoman of Yulon Motor, a Taiwan-based automaker which is known for building Nissan-brand automobiles. Wu also served as the chairwoman of Tai Yuen Textile, a textile producer, and China Motor, another automaker partly owned by Mitsubishi Motors.

Wu's father Woo Ching-yuen 吳慶運 was a businessman in the textile industry. She graduated from the Saint John's University, Shanghai, and received her master's degree at Columbia University. Her husband , who moved to Taiwan with Wu in 1948, was the founder of Yulon. Wu died in Taipei on 9 August 2008, and her son Kenneth Yen succeeded Wu in several executive positions.

References

20th-century Taiwanese businesspeople
Businesspeople from Changzhou
1913 births
2008 deaths
St. John's University, Shanghai alumni
Columbia University alumni
Taiwanese people from Jiangsu
Taiwanese women business executives
Taiwanese business executives
Corporate executives in the automobile industry